Carroll Junior/Senior High School is a public secondary school located in Flora, Indiana. The school serves about 550 students in grades 6 to 12 in the Carroll Consolidated School Corporation district.

Demographics
The demographic breakdown of the 324 students enrolled in 2018-2019 was:
Male - 51.9%
Female - 48.1%
Black - 0.6%
Hispanic - 3.1%
Native Hawaiian/Pacific Islander - 0.6%
White - 93.8%
Multiracial - 1.9%

29.0% of the students were eligible for free or reduced lunch.

Athletics
Carroll Jr./Sr. High School is a member of the Indiana High School Athletic Association and competes in the Hoosier Heartland Conference.
The school mascot is the Cougar and the school colors are royal blue and white. Carroll won the IHSAA Class A State football championship during the 1995–1996 school year.

FALL        
Varsity Football
Boys/Girls Cross Country
Varsity Boys Tennis
Varsity Girls Volleyball
Varsity Cheerleading
Varsity Boys Soccer

WINTER
Girls Varsity Basketball
Boys Varsity Basketball
Boys Varsity Wrestling
Girls Varsity Swimming
Boys Varsity Swimming

SPRING
Varsity Baseball
Varsity Golf
Varsity Boys/Girls Track
Varsity Girls Tennis
Varsity Girls Softball

Notable alumni
 Brandon Dillon, football player

See also
 List of high schools in Indiana

References

External links

School district

Educational institutions established in 1961
Public high schools in Indiana
Public middle schools in Indiana
Schools in Carroll County, Indiana
1961 establishments in Indiana